Damodaran Rohit (born 28 May 1992) is an Indian cricketer. He made his first-class debut for Chilaw Marians Cricket Club in the 2013–14 Premier Trophy on 24 January 2014. He made his List A debut for Puducherry in the 2018–19 Vijay Hazare Trophy on 19 September 2018. He made his first-class debut for Puducherry in the 2018–19 Ranji Trophy on 12 November 2018, scoring 138 runs in the first innings. He made his Twenty20 debut for Puducherry in the 2018–19 Syed Mushtaq Ali Trophy on 21 February 2019.

See also
 List of Chilaw Marians Cricket Club players

References

External links
 

1992 births
Living people
Indian cricketers
Chilaw Marians Cricket Club cricketers
Galle Cricket Club cricketers
Pondicherry cricketers
Place of birth missing (living people)